Kluky is a municipality and village in Mladá Boleslav District in the Central Bohemian Region of the Czech Republic. It has about 70 inhabitants. The village is well preserved and is protected by law as a village monument zone.

Geography
It lies in the Jizera Table.

History
The first written mention of Kluky is from 1264. The village was owned by less important aristocratic families. After the Battle of White Mountain, it was acquired by the Jesuit order.

Transport
The railway from Mladá Boleslav to Mělník runs through the municipality.

Sights
The almost entire built-up area is protected as a village monument zone. The village includes an extensive set of smaller cottages on narrow plots, among which timbered multi-storey houses from the end of the 18th century predominate.

References

External links

Villages in Mladá Boleslav District